Asterope optima is a species of butterfly of the family Nymphalidae.

Description
The wingspan of Asterope optima can reach . The coloration and patterns of this species are quite variable. Usually the dorsal sides of the wings are metallic bright blue with paler margins, while the under sides are basically grayish or pale blue with rows of small black spots and lines on the hindwings and a large reddish-orange patch on the basal half of the hindwings. The adults fly all year round but they are most common from September to November.

Distribution and habitat
This species can be found from southern Colombia through Ecuador to northern Peru and western Brazil.

References

LepIndex: The Global Lepidoptera Names Index. Beccaloni G.W., Scoble M.J., Robinson G.S. & Pitkin B., 2005-06-15

External links
Biolib
Encyclopaedia of Life
Catalogue of Life
Prepona.info

Biblidinae
Fauna of Brazil
Nymphalidae of South America
Butterflies described in 1869
Taxa named by Arthur Gardiner Butler